Pike County Schools could refer to the following school districts in the United States:

Pike County Schools (Alabama)
Pike County Schools (Kentucky)
Pike County School District in Georgia